Magmatic foliation is a term in geology, for foliation in granitoids that form by magmatic flow, "submagmatic flow," by high-temperature solid-state deformation and moderate- to low-temperature solid-state deformation.

Remember, granitoids are igneous rocks.

See also

 Foliation (geology)

References

Geology